Duke Zhuang may refer to these rulers from ancient China:

Duke Zhuang of Qin (died 778 BC)
Duke Zhuang of Zheng (757–701 BC)
Duke Zhuang I of Qi (died 731 BC)
Duke Zhuang of Chen (died 693 BC)
Duke Zhuang II of Qi (died 548 BC)

See also
King Zhuang (disambiguation)